Samuktala Sidhu Kanhu College, established in 2010, is the government aided degree college in Samuktala,  Alipurduar district.  It offers undergraduate courses in arts. It is affiliated to University of North Bengal.

See also

References

External links
Samuktala Sidhu Kanhu College
University of North Bengal
University Grants Commission
National Assessment and Accreditation Council

Universities and colleges in Alipurduar district
Colleges affiliated to University of North Bengal
Educational institutions established in 2010
2010 establishments in West Bengal